The  is a mini SUV produced by the Japanese automobile manufacturer Daihatsu since 1997 as the successor to the F300 series Rocky. It was initially offered in both short- and long-wheelbase configurations before the former stopped production in 2016 to be replaced by the A200 series Rocky crossover in 2019. The long-wheelbase variant is available mainly for the Indonesian market with three-row seating options. A smaller kei car model called the Terios Kid/Lucia was also available for the first-generation model.

Rear-wheel drive is standard across all generations, while four-wheel drive option was available for the first- and second-generation models.

Since August 2016, the Terios has been sold exclusively in Indonesia. Throughout three generations, it has also been marketed by Toyota and Perodua under various nameplates as well.

The name "Terios" is originated from the Old Greek word, which is roughly translated to "making dreams come true".

First generation (J100/F500; 1997) 

Initially previewed as the MS-X97, the first-generation Terios was available as a five-door wagon, and a smaller kei car model called the Terios Kid, which was only released in Japan. Model codes for the first generation were J100, J102 and J122. The Terios Kid arrived in October 1998 and continued to be built six years after the original Terios had been replaced. By the end of 2002, Daihatsu sold 33,000 units of Terios and 97,000 units of Terios Kid.

In 2000, Daihatsu gave the Terios a mild facelift both in the exterior and interior of the vehicle. A new chrome grille replaced the black plastic grille. The high-grade model gained electric front windows, central locking, rear seat head restraints, alloy wheels, roof rails and a roof-mounted rear spoiler. Mechanically, the 1.3-litre SOHC four-cylinder engine fitted to the previous model had been replaced by the new 1.3-litre DOHC four-cylinder engine. A sport version of the K3-VET engine was produced in Japan.

In Australia, a limited edition sports series was introduced in 2001 with only 200 units being available. The vehicle had body colour matching bumpers, different from the two-tone bumper colour on the standard model. Rear spoiler and sunroof became standard. The interior was updated with metallic paint finish on the centre console and dashboard.

This is the first Daihatsu automobile to be assembled in Venezuela, where production began in November 2001.

Versions 
 Terios (first generation)
 J100G 1997-1999 "HC-EJ" SOHC 1295 cc engine  4WD
 J102G 2000-2004 4WD
 engine "K3-VE" DOHC 1297 cc engine 
 engine "K3-VET" DOHC 1297 cc Turbo engine 
 J122G 2000-2004 2WD type ( K3-VE / K3-VET )
 Terios Kid (kei model, available in the Japanese domestic market until May 2012)
 J111G ( EF-DEM ) 1998-2005 Light pressure turbo 658 cc 4WD 
 J111G ( EF-DET ) 1998-2012 Inter cooler turbo 658 cc 4WD 
 J131G ( EF-DEM ) 1998-2005 Light pressure turbo 658 cc 2WD 
 J131G ( EF-DET ) 1998-2012 Inter cooler turbo 658 cc 2WD 
 Terios Lucia (limited edition)
 J111G / J131G for 2002-2003 only; variation of Terios Kid (without rear-mounted spare tyre)
 Taruna (Indonesia)
 F500RV / F520RV 1999-2001 "HD-C" carburettor / "HD-E" EFI SOHC 1589 cc engine  / 
 F501RV / F521RV 2001-2006 "HE-E" EFI SOHC 1498 cc engine

Markets

Japan 

A kei car version, called Terios Kid or Terios Lucia, also available for local market until 2012.

Malaysia 
In Malaysia, the Terios was locally assembled as the Perodua Kembara by Perodua. It was unveiled in August 1998. In June 2003, the Kembara was updated with DVVT engines. In July 2004, the Kembara CT Elegance was unveiled and came with ABS, front dual airbags, leather seats, different designed alloy rim, flat type side step and cubic printing cluster. It was priced at RM59,988 and only available in one colour: Klasik Gold.

Indonesia 

In Indonesia, a version of the Terios is known as the Daihatsu Taruna (chassis code: F500/F520), with a different front/rear styling and longer rear-based body capable of seating seven people. The name Taruna translates roughly as "young knight" or "cadet" in Indonesian. The Taruna was launched in July 1999 with a 1589 cc HD-C petrol engine with carburetor. It was initially available in short-wheelbase configuration only, the C-series. The engine was later replaced with a 1498 cc HE-E petrol engine with electronic fuel injection in 2001 and the long-wheelbase configuration, the F-series, was introduced with the same HD-C engine as the 1999-2001 C-series, and later replaced with the same HE-E engine as the 2001 C-series in the same year. The Taruna received facelifts in August 2001, July 2003, March 2004 and March 2005. It was available with CL and FL, CX and FX, and CSX and FGX grades. There were also CSR and FGZ special grades, which were similar to CSX and FGX, with a 1589 cc HD-E petrol engine with electronic fuel injection.

A refreshed version, called Taruna Oxxy, was launched in March 2005.

China 
In China, the Terios was produced under two different brand names: as the Zotye 2008/Hunter and 5008 powered with a 1.5-litre engine from Mitsubishi Motors (first series body); the Zotye was an unauthorised copy of the Terios, which caused some controversy, while FAW badged the Terios as the Huali Terios or Dario. In 2009, Daihatsu withdrew from the China market due to bad performance and sold the tooling and rights of this car to First Auto Works (FAW), who was their official joint venture partner in China. Production for the 2008 ran from 2005 to 2010, while the 5008 was produced from 2008 to 2013.

India 
In India, a Terios-derived vehicle known as the Premier RiO was sold from 2009. It was in turn a rebadged Zotye 2008, and assembled by Premier Automobiles Limited. It was powered by a Peugeot diesel and petrol engine and since 2012 had a Fiat 1.3 Multijet diesel option.

Second generation (J200/F700; 2006) 

The concept model called D-Compact 4x4 made an appearance in September 2005 at the 61st Frankfurt Motor Show and in November 2005 at the 39th Tokyo Motor Show before being named to Terios, which went into production in January 2006. The model codes are J200, J210 and J211 for the short-wheelbase configuration which has a 5-seater configuration; F700 and F710 for the long-wheelbase configuration that was built to accommodate the 7-seater configuration. It is built on a "built-in ladder frame" monocoque body, which is claimed to "achieve balance between lighter weight, higher body rigidity, and comfort".

In European, South American and most other Asian markets, the model is sold under the name Terios. Daihatsu designed and manufacture the Terios and also supplies the vehicle to Toyota as the  under a consigned/OEM manufacturing agreement. According to the company, the name "Rush" is inspired from a "sense of energetic vitality and cheerfulness".

Markets

Japan 
Both vehicles were announced on 17 January 2006. According to Daihatsu, the name "Be‣go" was derived from the combination of "being" and "going" words. The Rush was an exclusive model to the Toyopet Store dealership network.

Both use either 1.3-litre or 1.5-litre engine. Only the 1.5-litre variant is available with both two- or four-wheel drive. The vehicle has a permanent 4WD system via lockable central differential. However, it lacks low ratio gears.

A minor refresh of the Be‣go and Rush was unveiled on 13 November 2008 in Japan. The minor facelift brought redesigned front bumper, tail lamps, alloy wheel design for the G grade and a 5% improvement for fuel economy for the 2WD automatic model. The Be‣go and Rush were discontinued in March 2016 and succeeded by the A200 series Rocky/Toyota Raize crossover in November 2019.

South America 
In Chile, the second-generation Terios in short-wheelbase configuration was launched in 2006. It was re-branded as the Toyota Rush in August 2016, as Daihatsu left that market.

Indonesia 
The second-generation Terios and first-generation Rush were both launched in Indonesia on 14 December 2006, with the former succeeded the Taruna. Both cars were sold in long-wheelbase configuration and rear-wheel drive layout only. Three-row seating were standard on the Terios and optional on the Rush. The Terios was initially offered in TS, TS Deluxe, TS Extra, TX Deluxe, TX Elegant and TX Adventure grade levels, while the Rush came with G and S grades. On 1 October 2008, the Indonesian market Terios received updates such as standard body-coloured side body mouldings, as well as side visors, single SRS airbag on the driver's side and parking sensors, followed by the Rush in August 2009. The TX Elegant grade was removed in this update.

The Terios and Rush received their first facelift on 5 and 6 October 2010 respectively, equipped with dual SRS airbags as standard. The S grade of Rush was later replaced by TRD Sportivo grade on 29 August 2013. At the same time, the Terios received some minor updates.

On 20 March 2015, both the Terios and Rush received their second facelift, consisted of projector headlamps with LED positioning lamps, a wider grille with a chrome lower bar, a full-width air intake for the lower bumper and a blacked-out centre piece. The steering wheel was updated to the one used in F650 series Xenia/Avanza. The grade levels for Terios were renamed to X, X Extra, R and R Adventure. On 18 February 2016, the R Custom grade was added for the Terios, followed by TRD Sportivo Ultimo grade (with TRD suspension kits) for the Rush on 26 February. Three-row seating became standard on both TRD Sportivo grades.

Singapore 
In Singapore, the Terios is offered by the local distributor in both short- and long-wheelbase configurations with an 1.5-litre engine and as a 4WD as standard.

Malaysia 
In Malaysia, the second-generation Terios is available as the Toyota Rush (2008 to 2017) and Perodua Nautica (2008 to 2009). The Rush was introduced in January 2008 as a long-wheelbase model. Imported from Indonesia, it offers three-row seating as standard. The Nautica was introduced in April 2008 as a rebadged model of the short-wheelbase Terios/Rush. Available with standard four-wheel drive, it was imported from Japan as the replacement to the Perodua Kembara.

Toyota Rush 
The first-generation Rush was launched in Malaysia in January 2008. It is available in two grade levels: 1.5G (with either manual or automatic transmission) and 1.5S (with automatic transmission only). The Rush sold in Malaysia is the long-wheelbase model in seven-seat configuration.

In December 2010, the Rush received its first facelift for 2011.

In April 2015, the Rush received its second facelift with the same model in the Indonesian market. Exterior changes included redesigned front bumper, radiator grille and bonnet. The bumper is finished in a two-tone effect and the grille is finished with faux carbon-fibre. Elsewhere, there is a new integrated chrome lining highlight running across the headlamp and radiator grille, restyled tail lamps with combination LEDs and smoked lenses. The 1.5S has additional equipment including fog lamps, chrome covers for the wing mirrors, and leather steering wheel and gear knob.

Perodua Nautica 

Perodua launched the rebadged version of the short-wheelbase Terios, called Nautica in May 2008. The model was fully imported from Japan, except for the front grille, front bumper and rear bumper which are manufactured and fitted in Malaysia. It has a 1.5-litre DVVT engine, full-time 4WD, projector headlamps, and five seats with dark interior. The price tag of the Nautica is not much different from the long-wheelbase Rush. It comes with only two colour choices: Medallion Grey and Majestic Black, and comes in automatic transmission only. The Nautica was quietly discontinued in 2009, slightly less than a year after its launch. Only a mere total of 489 units were ever sold. The reason for the discontinuation was because as a national car company focused on local manufacturing, Perodua was unable to obtain sufficient necessary Approved Permits for vehicle importation, as the Nautica was imported in CBU form from Japan.

Safety 
2015 Toyota Rush ASEAN NCAP scores:

Awards 
In 2006, the Terios won the Red Dot Design Award.

Gallery

Short-wheelbase 
Daihatsu Terios

Long-wheelbase 
Daihatsu Terios

Toyota Rush

Third generation (F800/F850; 2017) 

The third-generation Terios was unveiled in Indonesia on 23 November 2017, along with the second-generation Rush. The development of the car was led by chief engineer Eiji Fujibayashi in 2015, with its design influenced from the FT Concept. Unlike previous models, these generation of cars are sold in long-wheelbase configuration only and neither the short-wheelbase configuration nor four-wheel drive option are offered. It uses the same platform as the long-wheelbase version of the second-generation model, albeit with some tweaks.

Compared to its predecessors, the design of the car has been made more streamlined, akin to crossovers. This model has a rear liftgate rather than a side-opening rear door and no longer has the spare tyre mounted on the rear door.

The model codes are F800 for the Terios/international market Rush and F850 for the Malaysian market Rush/Perodua Aruz.

Markets

Indonesia 
The Indonesian market Terios/Rush went on sale on 3 January 2018. Both models are offered only in three-row configuration.

The Terios was initially available in 4 grade levels: X, X Deluxe, R and R Deluxe. The R Custom grade was later added in August 2018. The Rush came with G and TRD Sportivo grades.

Due to high demand, the production of Terios and Rush was also conducted in Astra Daihatsu Motor's Karawang plant alongside the Sunter plant since August 2019.

In August 2021, the TRD Sportivo grade of Rush was renamed to GR Sport. Redesigned bumper add-ons and side body mouldings were included in this update. It also received start-stop system as standard, followed by Terios in September.

Philippines 
The Rush was released in the Philippines on 4 May 2018 and was initially offered in two grade levels: E, which has five seats and is available with either manual or automatic transmission, and G, which has seven seats and is only available with an automatic transmission.

In November 2020, the E grade received a reverse camera and 7-seater as standard.

In May 2022, the GR Sport grade was launched which replaced the previous top-spec G grade. The Rush was also updated with an updated 7-inch infotainment system with Apple CarPlay and Android Auto compatibility as standard for both the E and GR Sport grades.

Brunei 
After the replacement of the first- and second-generation Terios (sold under Daihatsu badge), the Rush was released in Brunei on 5 May 2018. The car is available in mid- or high-grade model lineups, four-speed automatic transmission and seven-seat variant only.

Bangladesh 
In Bangladesh, the Rush is only available in one grade level: S, which has 7 seats and 4-speed automatic transmission option only.

United Arab Emirates 
The Rush was released in UAE on 14 May 2018. Only a seven-seater version is available.

South Africa 
The Rush was released in South Africa on 4 July 2018, replaced the previous Daihatsu-badged Terios. It is only available in a five-seat version and offered in five-speed manual or four-speed automatic options.

Jamaica 
The Rush was released in Jamaica on 8 July 2018. Only a seven-seater version is available.

Colombia 
The Rush was released in Colombia on 26 July 2018. Only a seven-seater version is available.

Pakistan 
The Rush was unveiled in Pakistan on 31 August 2018. It went on sale on 10 September 2018. Three variants are available and there is only a seven-seat option.

Malaysia

Toyota Rush 
The Rush was launched in Malaysia on 18 October 2018. It is assembled by Perodua as a complete knock-down unit at its plant in Rawang, Selangor. There is only a seven-seat variant. It is only available with a four-speed automatic transmission though two grade levels are available: 1.5 G and 1.5 S. The 1.5 S grade is equipped with a pre-collision system.

Perodua Aruz 
The Rush is also sold by Perodua as the Perodua Aruz, which was launched on 15 January 2019. The name "Aruz" is taken from the Malay word "arus", meaning "flow". A media preview occurred in December 2018 while booking opened on 3 January 2019, and since then has made 2,200 bookings at the time of launch. There is only a seven-seat version. It is available only with a four-speed automatic transmission though two grade levels are available: 1.5 X and 1.5 AV (Advance). By March 2019, Perodua had successfully delivered 4,000 units of the Aruz with a total booking count at 14,000, and by the beginning of June 2019, roughly 13,000 Aruz had been delivered with a total booking count standing at 25,000.

The Aruz was went on sale in Singapore on 13 April 2021 and the car were offered only in 1.5 X variant.

Safety

Toyota Rush

Perodua Aruz

Recalls 
On 15 July 2019, Toyota had announced that around 60,000 units of the Indonesian market Rush manufactured from December 2017 to February 2019 would be recalled due to a problem regarding the airbags. It is stated that the affected models were found to have an improperly programmed airbag control module which could cause the side curtain airbags to accidentally deploy even when the vehicle is running normally. An impact on the rear wheel when passing a pothole or dent may be misinterpreted as a collision, which may cause deployment of the side curtain airbags. The Terios models were not affected due to the fact that the model is not being equipped with side curtain airbags.

Awards 
In July 2018, the car won the "Good Design Indonesia of The Year" award.

Gallery 
Daihatsu Terios

Toyota Rush

Perodua Aruz

Sales

References

External links 

  (Terios, Indonesia)
  (Rush, Indonesia)

Terios
Cars introduced in 1997
2000s cars
2010s cars
2020s cars
Mini sport utility vehicles
Rear-wheel-drive vehicles
All-wheel-drive vehicles
Cars powered by longitudinal 4-cylinder engines
ASEAN NCAP small off-road